is a railway station in the city of Shimotsuke, Tochigi, Japan, operated by the East Japan Railway Company (JR East).

Lines
Through services to and from the Tokaido Line and Yokosuka Line are also provided via the Shonan-Shinjuku Line and Ueno-Tokyo Line.

Station layout
This station has an elevated station building, located above two island platforms serving four tracks. The station has a Midori no Madoguchi staffed ticket office.

Platforms

History
Koganei Station opened on 25 March 1893. During World War II, Koganei Station was strafed by American fighter aircraft on 28 July 1945, killing some 30 civilians on a Tohoku Main Line train stopped at the station. A monument describing the event exists at the west exit of the station.  With the privatization of JNR on 1 April 1987, the station came under the control of JR East.

Passenger statistics
In fiscal 2019, the station was used by an average of 4136 passengers daily (boarding passengers only). The passenger figures for previous years are as shown below.

Surrounding area
Former Kokubunji town hall
Shimotsuke Koganei Post Office

References

External links

 JR East station information 

Stations of East Japan Railway Company
Railway stations in Tochigi Prefecture
Tōhoku Main Line
Utsunomiya Line
Railway stations in Japan opened in 1893
Shōnan-Shinjuku Line
Shimotsuke, Tochigi